John Ritchie may refer to:

Sportsmen 
John L. Ritchie (1876–?), Scottish footballer for Queen's Park FC and Scotland
John Ritchie (Australian footballer) (1932–2008), Australian rules footballer
John Ritchie (footballer, born 1941) (1941–2007), English football player for Sheffield Wednesday and Stoke City
John Ritchie (footballer, born 1944) (1944–2012), English football player
John Ritchie (footballer, born 1947) (1947–2018), Scottish football player and manager

Others 
John Ritchie (abolitionist) (1817–1887), American abolitionist
John Ritchie (American Civil War) (1836–1919), American Union Army officer, traveler and diarist
John Ritchie (composer) (1921–2014), New Zealand composer
John Ritchie (Maryland politician) (1831–1887), U.S. Representative from Maryland
John Ritchie (merchant) (c. 1745–1790), Scottish-born Canadian merchant, judge and politician
John Ritchie (newspaper owner) (1778–1870), Scottish publisher, owner of The Scotsman
John Ritchie, 3rd Baron Ritchie of Dundee (1902–1975), British peer and chairman of the Stock Exchange
Sir John Neish Ritchie (1904–1977), president of the Royal Veterinary College in London
Sid Vicious (John Simon Ritchie, 1957–1979), English musician
John William Ritchie (1808–1890), Canadian lawyer and politician

See also
Jon Ritchie (born 1974), American football player
Johnny Ritchey (1923–2003), American baseball player